League tables for teams participating in Kakkonen, the third tier of the Finnish football league system, in 2010.

League tables

Group A

Group B

Group C

Promotion playoffs

Ilves–HIFK 1–2
FC Santa Claus–Ilves 5–3
HIFK–FC Santa Claus 1–0

Footnotes

Sources
 Finnish FA (Suomen Palloliitto - Kakkonen 2010)

Kakkonen seasons
3
Fin
Fin